HSwMS Wale (3) was a destroyer of the Swedish Navy. Wale was built by Kockums Shipyard and launched on September 21, 1907 and delivered to the fleet on 11 April 1908. Wale was the first destroyer to be built in Sweden and was influential in the development of the destroyers in that nation. After Wale, in the years 1907–1911, another five destroyers followed with essentially the same design. Wale was decommissioned on 18 November 1940.

References

Notes

Print

Destroyers of the Swedish Navy
1907 ships
Ships built in Malmö
Shipwrecks of Sweden
Shipwrecks in the Baltic Sea
Ships sunk as targets